Kimberley Wells (born 18 July 1985) is an Australian racing cyclist, who has represented Australia in the United States, Middle East and Europe. Outside of professional cycling, Wells is a medical doctor working at the Australian Institute of Sport (AIS), as a medical specialist sports physician with the Australasian College of Sport and Exercise Physicians. She obtained her medical degree after six years in far North Queensland through the rural, remote, indigenous and tropical health focus at James Cook University.   

Wells was a talented road sprinter and prolific winner. Wells was coached by the 2004 Athens Olympics road race Gold Medalist, Sara Carrigan. She took up cycling seriously at university in 2003 after previously competing at a State level in Cricket and Soccer. Wells successfully completed the Australian Institute of Sport SAS selection camp to win her position within the Australian cycling team on tour in Europe. She was the 2015 Amy Gillett Foundation scholarship holder; the scholarship aspiring to honour Amy’s memory by supporting young women to the same pursuit of sporting and academic excellence. Wells has won two Australian National Criterium titles, her second coming after a coming back from a difficult year of illness and injury.

Major results

2011
 1st Overall Tour de Femme
2012
 1st Overall Sara Carrigan Shield
1st Sprints classification
 1st Overall Tour de Femme
 1st Cronulla GP
 Santos North Western Tour
1st Stage 4
3rd Criterium
 1st Sprints classification Tour of Bright
 Battle on the Border
2nd Tweed Road Race
3rd Criterium
 2nd Menzies Classic Handicap
 3rd Criterium, ACT Road Championships
 3rd Criterium, Goldfields Tour
2013
 1st  Criterium, National Road Championships
 1st Overall Santos Women's Cup
1st Stages 1 & 3
 1st San Rafael Twilight Criterium
 1st Boise Twilight Criterium
 1st East Troy Criterium
 1st Tour de Somerville
 1st Mopro Tour de Grove Criteriums
 1st Ron Van Mullica Handicap RR
 1st Stage 3 Tour de Elk Grove
 1st Sprints classification Nature Valley Stage Race
 2nd Overall Tour of America's Dairylands
1st Stages 1 & 4
 USA Crits Speedweek
2nd Downtown Walterboro Criterium
2nd Spartanburg Regional Classic
3rd Historic Roswell Criterium
 2nd Chris Thater Memorial Race
 3rd Overall Bay Classic Series
1st Stage 1
 3rd Tour de Grove
 3rd N.O.D.A. GP Criterium
2014
 1st SKCC Supercrit
 1st Launceston Cycling Classic
 1st Noosa GP
 Oceania Track Championships
2nd Scratch race
3rd Team pursuit (with Emily McRedmond, Alexandria Nicholls and Allison Rice)
2015
 1st  Criterium, National Road Championships
 1st Stan Siejka – Launceston Cycling Classic
 1st Stage 2 Trophée d'Or Féminin
 Adelaide Tour
1st Stages 3 & 4
 Battle on the Border
1st Stages 1 & 4
 7th Overall Bay Classic Series
2016
 1st Grand Prix Cycliste de Gatineau
 BC Superweek
1st Giro di Burnaby
2nd Gastown GP
2nd Port Colquitlam
 1st Stage 4 Cascade Cycling Classic
 1st Stage 2 Bay Classic Series
 2nd GP Lazzeratti Roma
 8th Overall Santos Women's Tour
1st Stage 4
 8th White Spot / Delta Road Race
2017
 1st Overall Tour of Gippsland
1st Stage 3
2018
 3rd Criterium, National Road Championships

See also
 Australian National Criterium Championships
 Seymour College

References

External links

 Kimberley Wells at High 5 Dream Team
 Kimberley Wells at 

1985 births
Living people
Australian female cyclists
Cyclists from Adelaide